The chestnut-backed thornbird (Phacellodomus dorsalis) is a species of bird in the family Furnariidae. It is endemic to Peru. Its natural habitat is Mediterranean-type shrubby vegetation. It is threatened by habitat loss.

References

External links
BirdLife Species Factsheet.

chestnut-backed thornbird
Birds of the Puna grassland
Endemic birds of Peru
chestnut-backed thornbird
chestnut-backed thornbird
Taxonomy articles created by Polbot